Also referred to as the Fugitive Felon Act (18 U.S.C. § 1073), Unlawful Flight to Avoid Prosecution is a United States federal law. Though drawn as a penal statute, and therefore permitting prosecution by the federal government for its violation, the primary purpose of the Fugitive Felon Act is to permit the federal government to assist in the location and apprehension of fugitives from state justice. No prior US Justice Department Criminal Division approval is required to authorize unlawful flight complaints in aid of the states. However, the statute expressly requires "formal approval in writing" by a designated department official before a UFAP violation can be actually prosecuted in federal court. (See USAM 9-69.460.) For information regarding use of a grand jury to locate a fugitive, see USAM 9-11.120.  Since the primary purpose of the Act is to assist the states in apprehending fugitives from state justice, the Act should not be applied to the interstate or international flight of federal fugitives. Arrest warrants issued under this act are commonly referred to as "UFAP warrants".

The charge carries a sentence of up to five years in prison.

External links
Sec. 1073. Flight to avoid prosecution or giving testimony
1962 Use of Unlawful Flight to Avoid Prosecution warrants (UFAPS)
Text of law from Cornell Law School

United States federal criminal legislation